Marine Drive is the name for three major roadways in Greater Vancouver, British Columbia, Canada. The roads are known for running parallel to major bodies of water, with some sections being a major arterial road, while other serve local traffic. Marine Way is the name applied to a section of Marine Drive that was bypassed in the early 1980s.

Burrard Peninsula 
The Burrard Peninsula section of Marine Drive passes through the University Endowment Lands as well as the Cities of Vancouver, Burnaby, and New Westminster, following the Burrard Inlet, Strait of Georgia, and the North Arm of Fraser River around Point Grey. In Vancouver, Marine Drive is prefixed by a quadrant and is divided into Northwest, Southwest, and Southeast sections; while in Burnaby and New Westminster it is simply known as Marine Drive. The northeastern and southeastern extremes of Marine Drive are relatively minor roadways; however, when the remainder is combined with 70th Avenue and Marine Way, it forms a  thoroughfare from the University of British Columbia to New Westminster and is one of the most important routes in the region. The section located within the University Endowment Lands is provincially maintained and known as Pseudo Highway 914:0620, which is unsigned, while southern section of Marine Drive / Marine Way along the North Arm of the Fraser River is part of TransLink's Major Road Network.

Route description 
Northwest Marine Drive begins at West 4th Avenue in the Vancouver neighbourhood of West Point Grey. It travels as a collector road north to Jericho Beach and turns west, following the south shore of Burrard Inlet and passing Locarno Beach and Spanish Banks. It leaves Vancouver and enters the University Endowment Lands, passing through Pacific Spirit Regional Park. The collector road ends at Chancellor Boulevard (the western extension of West 4th Avenue).

Northwest Marine Drive continues as a western continuation of Chancellor Boulevard along the perimeter of the Point Grey Campus of the University of British Columbia. At the western edge of Point Grey near Wreck Beach, the roadway turns south and becomes Southwest Marine Drive near the Totem Park student residences. It passes the UBC Botanical Garden and starts to head in a south-southeasterly direction. It becomes an arterial road as it leaves the UBC Campus and heads east through Pacific Spirit Regional Park and Shaughnessy Golf and Country Club, re-entering Vancouver in the Dunbar–Southlands neighbourhood, following the North Arm of Fraser River, but located a number of blocks away from the water. It passes through Kerrisdale and Marpole before turning due east along the 70th Avenue alignment just past Angus Drive. One block west of Granville Street, Southwest Marine Drive follows a short residential street and heads south and east, while the main roadway becomes West 70th Avenue, providing access to both Granville and Oak Streets.

When the residential section intersects Granville Street, Granville Street itself turns southeast and becomes Southwest Marine Drive. It reaches a Y-interchange at the north end of the Arthur Laing Bridge where traffic can access the Vancouver International Airport via Grant McConachie Way. Southwest Marine Drive turns in a northeasterly direction, passing underneath the Oak Street Bridge, again crossing West 70th Avenue, and passes Marine Gateway at Cambie Street. At Ontario Street, the roadway becomes Southeast Marine Drive and continues east into the Sunset neighbourhood. It passes through a partial cloverleaf at Knight Street at the north end of the Knight Street Bridge, and continues east through Victoria–Fraserview and Killarney. Just east of Kerr Street near Everett Crowley Park, the main roadway becomes Marine Way and continues east through Burnaby and New Westminster to the Queensborough Interchange, which provides access to the Queensborough Bridge and Highway 91A. East of the interchange, the roadway is known as Stewardson Way and continues along the waterfront into downtown New Westminster.

At the same time, Southeast Marine Drive runs parallel to Marine Way as a collector road through Champlain Heights. As it passes over Boundary Road, it enters Burnaby and simply goes by Marine Drive, separating the South Slope and Big Bend neighbourhoods with the roadway ending at a T-intersection at Southridge Drive. Marine Drive resumes as a residential street just east of the intersection as a right-in/right out from Southridge Drive and passes through the southwestern portion of the Edmonds before crossing into New Westminster and terminating at a dead end just east of 7th Avenue.

History 
Marine Drive used to continue east in New Westminster, passing through the Queensborough Interchange before continuing as Stewardson Way. Marine Way was constructed in the early 1980s to divert traffic from the eastern sections, and access to the interchange was cut off and traffic was diverted to the new roadway.

Major intersections

Main section

Eastern section

North Shore 
The North Shore section of Marine Drive is an arterial road that passes through the District of West Vancouver, as well as both the District and City of North Vancouver, following the north shore of Burrard Inlet. Prior to the opening of the Upper Levels Highway in 1957, Marine Drive carried Highway 99 between the Lions Gate Bridge and Horseshoe Bay. Marine Drive east of 21st Street is part of TransLink's Major Road Network.

Route description 
Marine Drive begins as a residential street in Whytecliff Park in West Vancouver and snakes around Batchelor Cove as well as the residential areas of Horseshoe Bay. Marine Drive passes an interchange with Highway 1 near the entrance to the Horseshoe Bay ferry terminal; this was formerly the site of the southern terminus of the Sea to Sky Highway prior to it being realigned in the early 2000s with the bypassed roadway now named Horseshoe Bay Drive. Marine Drive continues south and east along the mouth of Howe Sound to Lighthouse Park, where it turns east and follows Burrard Inlet. It continues for several kilometers along the shore until it becomes more commercial as it passes through the neighbourhoods of Ambleside and Dundarave, both of which form West Vancouver's main commercial district. Near Park Royal Shopping Centre, it intersects Taylor Way where Highway 99 briefly joins Marine Drive. After crossing the Capilano River, Highway 99 leaves Marine Drive at the base of the Lions Gate Bridge and heads towards Stanley Park and Downtown Vancouver.

Just east of the Lions Gate Bridge approach, Marine Drive passes through the District of North Vancouver for several blocks. It crosses Mackay Road where it enters the City of North Vancouver. It passes Capilano Mall and turns southeast where it reaches its terminus at the five-way intersection with Berwicke Avenue, Keith Road, and 3rd Street. Both Keith Road (due east) and 3rd Street (southeast) function as the eastern extension of Marine Drive and link to Lower Lonsdale, North Vancouver's main business district.

Major intersections

White Rock/South Surrey 
The White Rock/South Surrey section of Marine Drive is a collector road that passes through the Cities of Surrey and White Rock, following Semiahmoo Bay.

Route description 

Marine Drive begins in the South Surrey neighbourhood of Ocean Park at 128th Street. It travels east and crosses into White Rock at Bergstrom Road (136th Street) and follows the waterfront; the two are separated by the BNSF Railway. It passes through White Rock's historic commercial area and continues east, where it crosses back into Surrey at Stayte Road (160th Street) and continues east as 8th Avenue along the northern boundary of the Semiahmoo Indian Reserve.

8th Avenue intersects both Highway 99 and Highway 15. Due to its proximity to the U.S. Border, it serves as the main connector route between Peace Arch and Pacific Highway Border Crossings, with the section provincially maintained and internally known as Pseudo Highway 914:3186, which is unsigned. 8th Avenue continues east as a rural road towards the Township of Langley and Campbell Valley Regional Park.

Major intersections

References 

Streets in Vancouver
Transport in Greater Vancouver
Transport in Burnaby
Transport in New Westminster
Transport in North Vancouver (city)
Transport in North Vancouver (district municipality)
Transport in Surrey, British Columbia
Transport in West Vancouver
University Endowment Lands
White Rock, British Columbia